Borabanda is a residential area in Hyderabad, Telangana, India. It is close to Erragadda, Kukatpally, Jubilee Hills and Madhapur. It is administered as Ward No. 103 of Greater Hyderabad Municipal Corporation.

Borabanda is again divided into many sub-areas like Moti nagar, Kalyan nagar, Tulasi nagar, Parvat nagar etc.

The place is also famous for Bonalu Festival which is state festival of Telangana.And also famous NGO called Helping Society Foundation is started in 2015. It is run by group of youngsters below age 25.

Places of worship 

 Methodist church-Jaiwanth Nagar, Site3
 Sai baba temple at Bus stop
 St Francis Xavier, Peeli Dargah
 Noor Masjid. Borabanda
 Nalla pochamma temple, Parvatnagar

Transportation 
Borabanda railway station of the Hyderabad Multi-Modal Transport System provides railway transport towards Falaknuma, Lingampally and Nampally.

Telangana State Road Transport Corporation also provides bus connectivity to the neighbourhood.

Once we reach Borabanda bus stop we can reach Tulasi nagar or Parvat nagar via autos or on our vehicles.

From Kukatpally or JNTU we can reach Borabanda via the Khaitalapur bridge

References

Neighbourhoods in Hyderabad, India
Municipal wards of Hyderabad, India